This is a list of the counts of Roussillon who ruled over the eponymous County of Roussillon.

Carolingian counts
These counts were nominated by the Carolingian kings of France, of whom they were vassals.
Gaucelm (812–832)

Hereafter, also counts of Barcelona.
Berenguer of Toulouse (832–835) 
Bernat of Septimania (835–844) 
Sunifred I, also known as Sunyer, (844–848)
Guillem (848–850)
Aleran (850–852)
Odalric (852–858)
Humfrid (858–864)
Bernat of Gothia (865–878)

No longer counts of Barcelona.
Miro the Elder (878–895)

Independent counts
These counts were also counts of Empúries. By this time the counts were practically independent.
Sunifred II (895–915)
Bencion (915–916)
Gausbert (915–931)
Gausfred I, also known as Wilfred, (931–991)

The counts hereafter were no longer counts of Empúries.
Giselbert I,  also known as Guislabert, (991–1014)
Gausfred II (1014–1074)
Giselbert II (1074–1102)
Girard I, also known as Guinard, (1102–1113)
Gausfred III (1113–1164)
Girard II (1164–1172), died without heirs

After Girard II, the county of Roussillon was subsumed within the Crown of Aragón. Later, the title was briefly revived.
Sancho (1209–1223), also count of Cerdanya
Nuño Sancho (1223–1242), also count of Cerdanya

For subsequent counts of Roussillon (and Cerdanya), see Kingdom of Majorca.

French counts

Louis of Bourbon
Louis of Bourbon (1450–1487) was the first French Count of Roussillon. He was an illegitimate son of Charles I, Duke of Bourbon and Jeanne Bournan. In 1463, he was legitimated by letters patent. He was known for his many services to the Kingdom of France and was made an Admiral of France. Jeanne de Valois, Dame de Mirabeau et d'Usson en Auvergne, illegitimate daughter of Louis XI and Félizé Regnard, was given in marriage to Louis, by her father. Louis XI legitimated Jeanne in 1466. The marriage of Jeanne and Louis produced three children: Charles de Bourbon-Roussillon, 2nd comte de Roussillon; Suzanne, Countess of Roussillon and Ligny; and Anne, Dame de Mirabeau. Louis of Bourbon died on 19 January 1487 and was buried in the church of the Franciscan monastery of Valognes, which he founded.

Fictional counts
A fictional Count of Roussillon, Bertram, is a principal character in William Shakespeare's play All's Well That Ends Well.

See also
 County of Roussillon

References

 
Roussillon
Roussillon
Lists of Catalan people
Roussillon
Roussillon

ca:Comtat del Rosselló#Comtes de Rosselló
de:Grafschaft Rosselló#Liste der Grafen von Rosselló
es:Condado de Rosellón#Condes del Rosellón
fr:Comté de Roussillon#Listes des comtes de Roussillon
it:Contea del Rossiglione#Conti di Rossiglione
ru:Графство Руссильон#Графы Руссильона